Coumba Sow (born 27 August 1994) is a Swiss footballer who plays as a midfielder for Paris FC in the Division 1 Féminine and has appeared for the Switzerland national team.

Career
Sow has been capped for the Switzerland national team, appearing for the team during the 2019 FIFA Women's World Cup qualifying cycle.

International goals

Personal life
Sow is of Senegalese descent through her father. She is the cousin of Djibril Sow, another Swiss international footballer.

References

External links
 
 
 

1994 births
Living people
Swiss women's footballers
Swiss people of Senegalese descent
Swiss expatriate sportspeople in France
Expatriate women's footballers in France
Switzerland women's international footballers
Women's association football midfielders
Division 1 Féminine players
Paris FC (women) players
Oklahoma State Cowgirls soccer players
FC Zürich Frauen players
Swiss Women's Super League players
Footballers from Zürich
UEFA Women's Euro 2022 players
Swiss expatriate sportspeople in the United States
Expatriate women's soccer players in the United States
Swiss expatriate women's footballers